Medovukha is a Slavic honey-based alcoholic beverage very similar to mead, but it is made much faster (approx. 1 month of fermentation). These two words are related and go back to the Proto-Indo-European *médʰu (honey). Known in Eastern Europe since pagan times, it remained popular well into the 19th century (unlike in Western Europe, where by the Middle Ages mead had already been mostly replaced by wine and beer).

History and manufacture 
Wild honey farming was one of the first Slavic trades. They discovered that honey could be fermented, and the first fermented honeys appeared as a luxury product in Europe, where it was imported in huge quantities.

Fermentation occurs naturally over 15 to 50 years, originally rendering the product very expensive and only accessible to the nobility. However, Slavs found that fermentation occurred much faster when the honey mixture was heated, enabling Medovukha to become a folk drink in the territory of Rus'.

See also
 List of Russian dishes

Mead
Russian alcoholic drinks
Ukrainian alcoholic drinks
Belarusian alcoholic drinks
Russian inventions